This is a list of wars involving the People's Republic of China (PRC).

Wars involving the People's Republic of China

See also

 List of Chinese wars and battles
 List of wars involving the Republic of China
 List of wars involving Taiwan
 Other conflicts involving the People's Republic of China
 First Taiwan Strait Crisis (1954)
 Second Taiwan Strait Crisis (1958)
 Sino-Soviet border conflict (1969)
 Battle of the Paracel Islands (1974)
 Sino-Vietnamese border conflicts (1979–1991)
 Johnson South Reef Skirmish (1988)
 Third Taiwan Strait Crisis (1995)
 Scarborough Shoal standoff (2012)
 2020–2021 China–India skirmishes
 China and People's Republic of China
 List of Chinese battles
 Foreign relations of China
 History of China
 History of the People's Republic of China
 History of the Republic of China, prior to the People's Republic of China
 Naval history of China
 China
 Politics of China
 Relationships with neighboring countries
 Annexation of Tibet by the People's Republic of China
 China–Indonesia relations
 China–India relations
 China–Japan relations
 China–Malaysia relations
 China–Mongolia relations
 China–North Korea relations
 China–Oceania relations
 China–Russia relations
 China–Singapore relations
 China–South Korea relations
 China–Nepal relations
 China–Vietnam relations

Notes

References

Further reading
 August 7, 1967: North Vietnam and People's Republic of China sign aid agreement. History Channel: This Day in History.
 Boland-Crewe, Tara and David Lea. (2005) [2002]. The Territories of the People's Republic of China. London: Europa Productions, Taylor & Francis. 1-85743-149-9.
 China. Encyclopædia Britannica.
 Economic Times Bureau. (December 20, 2009). "Wars that People's Republic of China fought". The Economic Times.
 Jun, Niu. (August 10, 2012). The birth of the People's Republic of China and the road to the Korean War. Origins. Eds. Melvyn P. Leffler and Odd Arne Westad. Cambridge University Press. Cambridge Histories Online. Cambridge University Press. DOI:10.1017/CHOL9780521837194.012
 Li, Dr. Xiaobing. (2012). China at War: An Encyclopedia. ABC-CLIO. excerpt
 Lynch, Michael. (2010). The Chinese Civil War 1945–49. Oxford: Osprey Publishing. .
 MacKerras, Colin and Donald Hugh McMillen, Andrew Watson. (editors). (2001) [1998]. Dictionary of the Politics of the People's Republic of China. Routledge. .
 Military Power of the People’s Republic of China, 2007. Department of Defense: Annual Report.
 October 1, 1949: Mao Zedong proclaims People's Republic of China. History Channel: This Day in History.
 Zhu, Zhiqun. (editor). (2011). The People's Republic of China Today: Internal and External Challenges. Singapore: World Scientific Publishing. .

 
China, People's Republic of
Military history of the People's Republic of China
China history-related lists
Chinese military-related lists